The Finnish national cricket team is the team that represents Finland in international cricket. It is organised by the Cricket Finland.

History
Cricket was first played in Finland in the 1960s, but didn't become formally organised until the 1970s, under the auspices of the Helsinki Cricket Club. More clubs were founded in the 1990s, and the Finnish Cricket Association was founded in 1999. They became an affiliate member of the International Cricket Council (ICC) the following year. The CricketFinland logo/flag was designed by Jesse Karjalainen. In 2017, they became an associate member of the ICC.

Cricket is growing in the country, and there are currently 10 teams contesting the national league, over 300 male players, 30 female players, 20 ECB qualified coaches, and over 30 qualified umpires.

The Finnish national team has participated at various levels in European regional tournaments, their first coming in 2000, when they finished last in the ECC Representative Championship. They won the same tournament 2 years later, and were runners-up in 2004. They also competed in the ECC Affiliates Championship from 2001 to 2005, their best performance coming in their first year, when they finished in seventh place. They came last in 2005, placing them in Division Four of the newly expanded European Championship. They won that tournament in August 2006, giving them a spot in Division Three in 2007. In that tournament they were relegated to Division Four where they currently play.

2018-Present
In April 2018, the ICC decided to grant full Twenty20 International (T20I) status to all its members. Therefore, all Twenty20 matches played between Finland and other ICC members after 1 January 2019 will be a full T20I.

Finland's first T20I matches were played against Denmark on 13 July 2019, followed by a series against Spain the following month.

International grounds

Tournament history

European Cricket Championship
2006: 1st place (Division Four)
2007: 8th place (Division Three)
2009: 5th place (Division Four)

Finnish Cricket Association

The Finnish Cricket Association (Suomen Krikettiliitto ry) was set up in 1999 to develop and organise the game of cricket in Finland. The Finnish Cricket Association is currently responsible for the following areas:

Finnish national league (Suomen mestaruussarja), an 11 team league with clubs from the national capital Helsinki, and the cities of Turku and Tampere.
Youth development: An introductory level schools programme in the capital area, aided by developing club youth programmes.	
National team: The national team won the 2006 European Championship Division 4, enabling them to move up to Division 3 in 2007, from which they were relegated back to Division 4.
Regional Development: Tampere and Turku are already thriving regional centres of cricket development. Oulu, Jyväskylä and Lahti form the basis of the expansion of this programme.	
Umpiring: Each Finnish league game is officiated by ACUS/ ECC qualified umpires.
The Finnish Cricket Championships

Domestic structure
Cricket in Finland has been expanding, here is the current list of teams playing in SM50 (the first division), SM40 (the second division), Developmental T20 League, Open T20 League and Indoor League.

Arctic Wolves Cricket Club
Bengal Tigers Cricket Club
Ekenäs Cricket Club 
Empire Cricket Club (also social team: Empiricists)
Espoo Cricket Club
Finnish Pakistani Club
FinnAsia Cricket Club
Helsinki Cricket Club
Merisotakoulun Krikettiklubi – Naval Academy Cricket Club
Men's Thinking Society
Stadin Krikettikerho (also social team: Socialists) 
Tampere Cricket Club
Tampere Eagles Cricket Club
Turku Cricket Club
Vaasa Cricket Club
Vantaa Cricket Club
Jyväskylä Cricket Club
Finnish National Team
Finnish Youth National Team
Phoenix – The Ladies Team
Everest 8848 CC
Oulu Cricket Club
 Saimaa Cricket Club

Records
International Match Summary — Finland
 
Last updated 19 July 2022

Twenty20 International
 Highest team total: 185/8 v. Spain on 17 August 2019 at Kerava National Cricket Ground, Kerava
 Highest individual score: 79, Nathan Collins v. Estonia on 19 June 2022 at Kerava National Cricket Ground, Kerava  
 Best individual bowling figures: 3/11, Md Nurul Huda v. Denmark on 13 July 2019 at Svanholm Park, Brøndby

T20I record versus other nations

Records complete to T20I #1675. Last updated 19 July 2022.

See also
 List of Finland Twenty20 International cricketers
 Finland women's national cricket team
 Cricket in Finland

References

External links
 Official Site
 Helsinki Cricket Club - Oldest cricket club in Finland , since 1972
 Tampere Cricket Club, Winner of 2006 Finnish league
 Empire Cricket Club, Helsinki
 Nepal Cricket Club Ry, Finland - Everest 8848, Helsinki

Cricket in Finland
National cricket teams
Cricket
Finland in international cricket